Elements Garden is a Japanese group of music composers, or a "music production brand" as they call themselves. They generally produce music for video games, anime and recording artists. They are attached to Aria Entertainment.

The group was formed in 2004 by Noriyasu Agematsu, Junpei Fujita, Hitoshi Fujima and Daisuke Kikuta, former members of Feel, a band of composers that similarly composed music for games and anime that disbanded shortly after Elements Garden's formation. Agematsu acts as the lead representative for the group.

Elements Garden released their eponymous first album in August 2008, a compilation of various game theme songs produced over the past years. A second album, Tone Cluster, was released the following year in September. Both albums were released under King Records.

Members

Current members
 Noriyasu Agematsu (上松範康) – founding member - leader
 Junpei Fujita (藤田淳平) – founding member
 Hitoshi Fujima (藤間仁) – founding member
 Daisuke Kikuta (菊田大介) – founding member
 Seima Iwahashi (岩橋星実) – joined in 2011
 Ryutaro Fujinaga (藤永龍太郎) – joined in 2014
 Asuka Oda (織田あすか) - joined in 2015
 Ryota Tomaru (都丸椋太) – joined in 2015
 Yuta Kasai (笠井雄太) – joined in 2016
 Yusuke Takeda (竹田祐介) – joined in 2017
 Kotaro Shimoda (下田晃太郎) - joined in 2019
 Seima Kondo (近藤世真) - joined in 2020
 Yuki Hidaka (日高勇輝) – joined in 2020

Former members
 Masato Nakayama (中山真斗) – joined in 2007; left in 2013
 Haruki Mori (母里治樹) – joined in 2009; left in 2018
 Tomohiro Kita (喜多智弘) – joined in 2011; left in 2016
 Evan Call – joined in 2012; left in 2016
 Ryota Suemasu (末益涼太) – joined in 2014; left in 2019

Discography
 Elements Garden (Released August 6, 2008)

 Elements Garden II -TONE CLUSTER- (Released September 2, 2009)

 Elements Garden III -phenomena- (Released September 22, 2010)

Artists Elements Garden has composed for
Ai Kayano
Aoi Yūki
Asaka
ASCA
Ayahi Takagaki
Aina Aiba
BanG Dream!
Afterglow
Hello, Happy World!
Morfonica
Pastel＊Palettes
Poppin'Party
Raise A Suilen
Roselia
Chiai Fujikawa
Choucho
D4DJ
Peaky P-key
Daisuke Ono
ELISA
Emi Nitta
Faylan
GHOST CONCERT
Haruka Shimotsuki
HIMEKA
Hiromi Satō
Hironobu Kageyama
Inori Minase
KAKO
Kaori Oda
Kazco
Kinki Kids
KIRIKO
kozue
Lia
JAM Project
Maho Tomita
MAKO
Mamoru Miyano
Maneki Kecak
Maon Kurosaki
Marie
Marina Kawano
Masaaki Endoh
Mikoi Sasaki
Minami
Mashiro Ayano
Megu Sakuragawa
Michi
Mico Yada
Mika Agematsu
miko
Minako Kotobuki
Minami Kuribayashi
Minori Chihara
Miyuki Hashimoto
Mokuren
Love Live!
Nagi Yanagi
NANA
Nana Mizuki
Rekka Katakiri
Rina Hidaka
Riryka
Rita
savage genius
Sayaka Sasaki
Shouta Aoi
Sphere
ST☆RISH
Starnova
Suara
Takanori Nishikawa
Takuma Terashima
Triad Primus
Wataru Hatano
Yōko Hikasa
Yoshino Nanjo
yozuca*
Yui Horie
Yui Sakakibara
YuiKaori
YURIA

References

External links
 Aria Entertainment 
 Elements Garden at King Records' site 

Anime composers
Video game composers
Japanese composers
Japanese rock music groups
BanG Dream!